Gwen Lee (born Gwendolyn Lepinski; November 12, 1904 – August 20, 1961) was an American stage and film actress. Lee began her career as a model before being discovered and signed to Metro-Goldwyn-Mayer. She was typically cast in supporting roles. Lee appeared in over sixty films before retiring in 1938.

Acting career
Born to Mriette (née Kennedy) and Frank B. Lepinski in Hastings, Nebraska, Lee began her career as a department store model. She was discovered by director Monta Bell while appearing in a stage production. She signed a contract with Metro-Goldwyn-Mayer in 1925. That same year, she made her film debut in Lady of the Night, starring Norma Shearer. She followed with roles in Pretty Ladies, starring Zasu Pitts, His Secretary, and The Plastic Age, starring Clara Bow. In 1926, Lee was cast in The Lone Wolfe Returns, starring Bert Lytell and Billie Dove.

In 1928, she was named a WAMPAS Baby Star. Lee continued her career with supporting roles in Laugh, Clown, Laugh  and The Actress (both 1928). Her career continued for almost a decade into the era of sound motion pictures. Lee played Marjory in Untamed (1929), with Joan Crawford and Robert Montgomery. She appeared again with Crawford and Marie Prevost in the prison drama Paid (1930). In 1931, she was in The Galloping Ghost, with famed football running back Red Grange, and the crime drama, The Lawless Woman, with Vera Reynolds. In 1932, she appeared in the Western Broadway to Cheyenne (1932), with Rex Bell.

By the late 1930s, Lee was appearing in minor film roles most of which were uncredited. Her final film roles were in Man-Proof and Paroled from the Big House, both in 1938.

Personal life

Lee was sued by her mother, Etta Lepinski, in March 1932. Lee was charged in a petition for guardianship. The suit alleged that Lee was incompetent to handle her affairs, specifically she was incapable of managing her jewelry and personal property, valued in excess of $1,000 (about $17,208 in 2019). The case was filed in Los Angeles, California Superior Court. Lee's mother dropped the suit in April, citing improvement in her daughter's health. Later that same year, Lee was also sued by two clothiers for nonpayment.

On May 4, 1943, she married George Mence, Jr.

Death
Lee died on August 20, 1961, aged 56, from undisclosed causes in Reno, Nevada.

Filmography

References

Additional sources
The Los Angeles Times, Maytime Will Have Ensemble, August 19, 1923, Page III 37.
The Los Angeles Times, Gwen Appears, August 14, 1925, Page A9.
The Los Angeles Times, Another Discovery, August 30, 1925, Page D18.
The Los Angeles Times, Quartet of Beauties Who Will Vie for Eastern Star Cup, Page B2.
The Los Angeles Times, Film Displays Fashions, October 20, 1925, Page A11.
The Los Angeles Times, Actress Sued On Clothes Account, May 24, 1932, Page A8.

External links

Gwen Lee at Virtual History

1904 births
1961 deaths
20th-century American actresses
Actresses from Nebraska
Female models from Nebraska
American film actresses
American silent film actresses
American stage actresses
Metro-Goldwyn-Mayer contract players
People from Hastings, Nebraska
WAMPAS Baby Stars